The Kraków Tigers are an American football team based in Kraków, Poland founded in 2006. They  play in the first division of the Polish American Football League.

Season-by-season records

See also
 Sports in Kraków

References

External links 
 

American football teams in Poland
Sport in Kraków
American football teams established in 2006
2006 establishments in Poland